Elizabeth Ann Duncan (born Hazel Lucille Sinclaira Nigh  (April 16, 1904  in Kansas City, Missouri – August 8, 1962) was an American murderess. She was convicted of orchestrating the murder of her daughter-in-law in 1958. She was the last woman to be executed in California before the United States Supreme Court suspended the death penalty under Furman v. Georgia.

Duncan was convicted of hiring 24-year-old Augustine Baldonado and 23-year-old Luis Moya to murder her daughter-in-law, Olga Duncan, who was seven months pregnant at the time. All three were executed in the gas chamber at San Quentin State Prison on August 8, 1962, the last triple execution in California.

Early life
Duncan admitted in court to having been married 10 times. She had been arrested for operating a brothel in San Francisco, and passing bad checks. She had made her son, Frank, the center of her life. She also had a daughter, Patricia, who died at age 15. Under oath, Duncan admitted that she had four children in total, but loved Frank the most.

Son's marriage
When her son Frank threatened to move out of the apartment they shared, Elizabeth attempted suicide via an overdose of pills. During her recovery at Cottage Hospital in Santa Barbara, she was cared for by nurse Olga Kupczyk. Frank dated Kupczyk, then married her on June 20, 1958 after learning that she was pregnant. A furious Elizabeth harassed Olga at work, forcing her to change addresses several times, and even admitted in court to plotting to kidnap Frank "to try to talk some sense into him. I didn't want to lose Frankie. I couldn't stand life alone and I knew it." The couple separated two weeks after they married.

Case
In November 1958, Olga Duncan disappeared. Her mother-in-law first drew suspicion when police discovered she had illegally obtained an annulment by hiring a man, Ralph Winterstein, to pose as Frank while she posed as Olga.

Nearly a month later, investigators found Olga in the Casitas Pass of Carpinteria. Baldonado confessed that he and Moya had been offered $6,000 by Duncan to kill Olga, then directed the police to the site. According to the coroner and their confession, the two men kidnapped her, beat her with a pistol, strangled her, and buried her in a shallow grave. She may still have been alive when buried. Duncan got his mother's bail reduced from $50,000 to $5,000, then went into hiding. Elias Kupczyk traveled from his home in Benito, Manitoba, but could not bring his daughter's remains back to Canada until her now-missing husband, by law, her next-of-kin, was located.

The trial began on February 24, 1959. Duncan testified that Moya and Baldonado attempted to blackmail her, refuting the accounts of every witness called by the prosecution, including Moya and Baldonado. Her attorneys then presented the theory that Olga was the victim of a ransom plot. The jury took 4 hours and 51 minutes to find her guilty on March 16, 1959; she was sentenced to death four days later. Frank, Burt M. Henson, and two other attorneys represented her in the appeals process; Henson was appointed by trial judge Charles Blackstock to represent Baldonado  and Moya. Governor Pat Brown, an opponent of capital punishment, ultimately allowed the executions to proceed. Right up until the minutes before her execution, Duncan fought to save his mother's life.

Publications
Deborah Holt Larkin, A Lovely Girl: The Tragedy of Olga Duncan and the Trial of One of California's Most Notorious Killers, Pegasus Crime, 2022.
Jim Barrett, Ma Duncan, Pentland Press, 2004

References

External links
Scocal.stanford.edu
"First woman is executed in the US since 1962", New York Times, 3 November 1984
People v. Elizabeth Duncan (Murder), Ventura County District Attorney Notable Case

1904 births
1962 deaths
20th-century executions by California
20th-century executions of American people
American female murderers
American people executed for murder
Executed American women
People convicted of murder by California
People executed by California by gas chamber